Sinnai, Sìnnia in Sardinian language, is a comune (municipality) of the Metropolitan City of Cagliari  in the Italian region Sardinia, located about  northeast of Cagliari.

Sinnai borders the following municipalities: Burcei, Castiadas, Dolianova, Maracalagonis, Quartucciu, San Vito, Settimo San Pietro, Soleminis, Villasalto, Villasimius.

Twin towns
 Tempio Pausania, Italy
 Armungia, Italy
 Bovolone, Italy
 Foza, Italy
 Asiago, Italy

References

External links
 Official website

Cities and towns in Sardinia